Gorom Gorom Airport  is a public-use airport located  east-northeast of Gorom Gorom, Oudalan, Burkina Faso.

See also
List of airports in Burkina Faso

References

External links 
 Airport record for Gorom Gorom Airport at Landings.com

Airports in Burkina Faso
Oudalan Province